Tristar (Chinese: 大三元) is a 1996 Hong Kong comedy film directed by Tsui Hark and starring Leslie Cheung, Anita Yuen and Lau Ching-wan.

Cast and roles
Leslie Cheung as Chung Kwok-keung
Anita Yuen as Pak Suet-fa
Lau Ching-wan as Lau Ching-fat
Sunny Chan as Hung
Elvina Kong as Tung Tung
Catherine Hung as Mary
Chung King-fai as Dinosaur
Moses Chan as Chan Chun-nam
Hung Yan-yan as Loanshark Tai
Pau Hon-lam as Father John
Shing Fui-On as Father Robin
Lee Heung-kam
Paul Fonoroff as Mormon preacher
Raymond Wong Pak-ming as Supt. Wong
Michael Tse as Pedestrian
Jason Chu as Pedestrian

External links

HK cinemagic entry
loveHKfilm entry

1996 films
1996 romantic comedy films
Hong Kong romantic comedy films
Hong Kong slapstick comedy films
1990s Cantonese-language films
Films directed by Tsui Hark
Films set in Hong Kong
Films shot in Hong Kong
1990s Hong Kong films